Charles Francis Lynch (January 9, 1884 – June 17, 1942) was a United States district judge of the United States District Court for the District of New Jersey.

Education and career

Born on January 9, 1884, in Franklin, New Jersey, Lynch read law in 1906. He entered private practice in Paterson, New Jersey from 1906 to 1913. He was an Assistant United States Attorney for the District of New Jersey from 1913 to 1916, serving as Second Assistant United States Attorney from 1913 to 1914, and as First Assistant United States Attorney from 1914 to 1916. He was the United States Attorney for the District of New Jersey from 1916 to 1919.

Federal judicial service

Lynch was nominated by President Woodrow Wilson on June 16, 1919, to a seat on the United States District Court for the District of New Jersey vacated by Judge Thomas Griffith Haight. He was confirmed by the United States Senate on July 1, 1919, and received his commission the same day. His service terminated on March 31, 1925, due to his resignation.

Later career and death

Following his resignation from the federal bench, Lynch returned to private practice in Paterson from 1925 to 1942. He was a city councilman for Paterson until 1940. He died on June 17, 1942.

References

Sources
 

1884 births
People from Franklin, New Jersey
United States Attorneys for the District of New Jersey
Judges of the United States District Court for the District of New Jersey
1942 deaths
United States district court judges appointed by Woodrow Wilson
20th-century American judges
United States federal judges admitted to the practice of law by reading law
Assistant United States Attorneys